The Cabinet of President Umaru Yar'Adua was made up of the Ministers and Ministers of State appointed by Nigerian President Umaru Yar'Adua. The cabinet continued to govern for a few weeks under Acting President Goodluck Jonathan after Yar'Adua fell terminally ill.

History

The cabinet replaced that of Yar'Adua's predecessor President Olusegun Obasanjo, and was named in July 2007, two months after Yar'Adua had assumed office.
Yar'Adua created a new cabinet position, the Minister of the Niger Delta, as part of his creation of the Niger Delta Ministry.
In October 2008, Yar'Adua announced a major cabinet reshuffle, with 20 of the 41 ministers or ministers of state being dropped from the cabinet. Several of the remaining ministers assumed temporary responsibility for other ministries pending confirmation hearings for the Yar'Adua's new nominees.
There was a considerable delay before Yar'Adua swore in sixteen new ministers on 17 December 2008.
In July 2009, Yar'Adua announced a minor cabinet shuffle. The Minister of the Interior, retired general Godwin Abbe, was moved to the Defense Ministry, replacing Shettima Mustapha who took his place as Minister of Interior. The Ministers of State of these two ministries also traded places. The move was apparently an effort to speed up resolution of the Niger Delta Conflict.

The cabinet became part of a power struggle within the Nigerian government after Yar'Adua became extremely ill and left Nigeria to seek treatment in Saudi Arabia, without transferring power to Goodluck Johnathan, his vice-president.

Johnathan dissolved the cabinet on 17 March 2010 in what The New York Times called "the strongest assertion yet of his authority over a country where his rule has been challenged". Motives given for the dissolution of the cabinet were Jonathan's desire to take the government in a new direction as well as fighting within the cabinet over how much power Jonathan should exercise as acting president.

Cabinet membership

See also
Cabinet of Nigeria

References

Federal ministers of Nigeria
Federal Ministries of Nigeria
Umaru Yar'Adua